Castle Hall may refer to:
 Castle Hall School and Specialist Language College, located in Mirfield, United Kingdom.
 Osaka-jō Hall, or Osaka Castle Hall
 Castle Hall (Goldsboro, Maryland), listed on the NRHP in Maryland

Architectural disambiguation pages